Siansivirga zeaxanthinifaciens is a Gram-negative, strictly aerobic and rod-shaped bacterium from the genus of Siansivirga which has been isolated from seawater from the coast of the China Sea in Taiwan.

References

Flavobacteria
Bacteria described in 2013